Bajiao Amusement Park may refer to:

Beijing Shijingshan Amusement Park, also known as Bajiao Amusement Park, in Beijing, China
Bajiao Amusement Park Station, station at Line 1, Beijing Subway